Edward Lorens (born 28 December 1953) is a retired Polish football midfielder and later manager.

References

1953 births
Living people
People from Żary
Polish footballers
Association football midfielders
Promień Żary players
Ruch Chorzów players
Wolfsberger AC players
APIA Leichhardt FC players
Ekstraklasa players
I liga players
Polish football managers
GKS Tychy managers
Ruch Chorzów managers
Górnik Zabrze managers
Polonia Bytom managers
Pogoń Szczecin managers
Dyskobolia Grodzisk Wielkopolski managers
Anorthosis Famagusta F.C. managers
GKS Katowice managers
Polish expatriate footballers
Expatriate footballers in Austria
Polish expatriate sportspeople in Austria
Expatriate soccer players in Australia
Polish expatriate sportspeople in Australia
Polish expatriate football managers
Expatriate football managers in Cyprus
Polish expatriate sportspeople in Cyprus